Class Clown Spots a UFO is the 17th album by Dayton, Ohio rock group Guided by Voices. The album is the second released since the reunion of the band's classic lineup earlier in the same year and it debuted at #12 on Billboard'''s Top Heatseekers'' albums chart.

Track listing

References

Guided by Voices albums
2012 albums
Self-released albums
Fire Records (UK) albums